Kimberly High School is a high school located at 885 Center Street West in Kimberly, Idaho. The school serves grades nine through twelve. Its historic building, at 141 Center Street West, is currently used by the school district as a general sports center, and the building is listed on the National Register of Historic Places.

Student attendance
As of the 2021-2022 school year, the high school has a student attendance of 560 students, the highest record for the school. Data of student attendance for the 06-07, 07-08, 09-10, 11-12, 13-14, 14-15, 16-17, 17-18, and 19-20 classes are not currently known to exist. The lowest known student attendance belongs to the class of 2005, with 406 students.

Sports
In 2010, the Kimberly Bulldogs lost a close football game to American Falls 46–41, and lost their homecoming game to Sugar-Salem 30–8. However, they were the conference champions and won third place at state.

In 2017, the volleyball team placed third at the state championship. Football continues to be strong, cross country girls placed second at state, and swim placed first at districts up against 4A schools, despite Kimberly being a 3A school.

In 2022, the boys basketball team won the state championship for the first time in 70 years against McCall-Donnelly with a record of 40-22.

History

The Kimberly High School at 141 Center St. W. in Kimberly, Idaho was built in 1916, and was officially listed on the National Register of Historic Places in 1990. The building was designed and built by Boise architect B. Morgan Nisbet. The structure was once used as the Kimberly Junior High and District Office.

References 

Public high schools in Idaho
Schools in Twin Falls County, Idaho
School buildings on the National Register of Historic Places in Idaho
National Register of Historic Places in Twin Falls County, Idaho
Buildings and structures completed in 1916